Pine-Richland High School is a large public high school located at 700 Warrendale Road, in Gibsonia, Pennsylvania, United States.  It is the only high school in the Pine-Richland School District and is located in Pine Township. In the 2018–2019 school year, the enrollment was 1,543 students.

History
Richland High School was opened in September 1956, which allowed the students who transferred from other schools to spend the final two years of their public education at PRHS, along Bakerstown-Warrendale Road in Richland Township. The first class graduated in June, 1958. The former building closed in 1993 and became Richland Elementary School in 1994. The new high school became Pine-Richland High School, and was opened at its current location in Pine Township in 1993.

The Pine-Richland Stadium was built on the new secondary campus between the middle school and the high school in 2001.

The current building was opened in 1993, with one gymnasium, a pool, nearly 80 classrooms, office space, and a large auditorium. An addition opened in 2000 with modifications to the original building, plus nearly 30 more classrooms, a new gymnasium, and the new district office.  Another addition to the school was completed in October 2012, adding a new STEAM wing, graphic design and art rooms along with engineering rooms where students may elect to take classes on such topics.

Extracurriculars
The Pine-Richland School District offers a wide variety of clubs, activities and an extensive sports program.

Pine Richland offers a Junior Reserve Officers' Training Corps program that stresses honor and commitment, which mostly enforces rules of the armed forces, and more often than not encourages military enrollment.

Arts

The Annual Pine Richland Art Show takes place at the beginning of May, showing portfolios of Advanced Placement art students and alumni.

The band course contains both a fall/winter marching band section and a later year ensemble experience. The Pine-Richland Rams Marching Band has a yearly repertoire consisting of an "opener," a tuba feature, a band dance (during which the drumline is featured), a colorguard feature, a dance team feature, a closer, and various other songs. The second part of the band course, the ensemble band, focuses on musical ability. Jazz Ensemble provides a venue where well-performing students can play jazz and blues music. Each year the school features a musical for which students must try out, including music from a selected pit orchestra.

The school competes at the Gene Kelly Awards each year, an award ceremony for local high schools in the greater Pittsburgh area.

The school has a chapter of the International Thespian Society. Each fall, the club sponsors a fall production.

Pine-Richland has a video production program that is offered to all grades.

Sports
The Pine-Richland High School's mascot is the Ram. The Rams baseball, girls soccer, hockey, gymnastics, and volleyball teams were all state champions in the 2005–2006 school year. There were five state championship teams in 2006: girls volleyball, girls soccer, baseball, boys tennis doubles, and gymnastics.  In 2005 the girls soccer team defeated the number one ranked team in the nation to win their first PIAA state title. In 2006, the Pine-Richland wrestling team were section champions. Pine Richland's competition cheerleading team was 3rd in the nation in the 2012–2013 school year. In November 2014, the football team won the AAAA WPIAL Championship against defending champion Pittsburgh Central Catholic. 

Varsity

Boys
Baseball – AAAA
Basketball – AAAA
Cross country – AAA
Football – AAAA
Golf – AAA
Ice hockey – AAA
Lacrosse – AAAA
Soccer – AAA
Swimming and diving – AAA
Tennis – AAA
Track and field – AAA
Volleyball – AAA
Wrestling – AAA

Girls
Basketball – AAAA
Cheer – AAAA
Cross country – AAA
Field hockey – AAA
Golf – AAA
Gymnastics – AAAA
Lacrosse – AAAA
Soccer (fall) – AAA
Softball – AAAA
Swimming and diving – AAA
Tennis – AAA
Track and field – AAA
Volleyball – AAA

Lip dub
In 2014, Pine-Richland High School saw viral success with their lip dub of American Authors' song "Best Day of my Life."  It was featured on local news outlets and seen across the world on Yahoo! Sports. As of January 2016 the video had nearly 300,000 views on YouTube.

Notable alumni
 Jeff Calhoun (1978) – Tony Award-winning choreographer
 Stephen Frick (1982) – astronaut
 Blake Lalli (2001) – Former Major league baseball player, Current Manager of the Reno Aces
 Kevin McCabe (2003) – football player
 Neil Walker (2004) – Former Major League Baseball player
Meghan Klingenberg (2007) – midfielder for the Houston Dash and the United States women's national soccer team
Brandon Saad (2011) – left winger for the St. Louis Blues
Ben DiNucci (2015) - Quarterback for the Dallas Cowboys
 Jackie Evancho (2018), singer
Phil Jurkovec (2018) - Quarterback for Boston College Eagles football

References

External links
 PRHS
 The school's latest Keystone, PSSA, AP, ACT and SAT scores

Schools in Allegheny County, Pennsylvania
Public high schools in Pennsylvania
Education in Pittsburgh area
Educational institutions established in 1993
1993 establishments in Pennsylvania